Arizona was admitted to the Union on February 14, 1912. U.S. senators from Arizona belong to Class 1 and Class 3 and are popularly elected for a six-year term beginning January 3. Elections are held the first Tuesday after November 1. The state's current U.S. senators are Independent Kyrsten Sinema, serving since 2019, and Democrat Mark Kelly, serving since 2020.

List of senators

|- style="height:2em"
| colspan=3 | Vacant
| nowrap | Feb 14, 1912 –Mar 27, 1912
| Arizona became a state February 14, 1912, but didn't elect its U.S. senators until March 27.
| rowspan=4 | 1
| rowspan=2 
| rowspan=3 | 1
| Arizona became a state February 14, 1912, but didn't elect its U.S. senators until March 27.
| nowrap | Feb 14, 1912 –Mar 27, 1912
| colspan=3 | Vacant

|- style="height:2em"
! rowspan=15 | 1
| rowspan=15 align=left | Henry F. Ashurst
| rowspan=15  | Democratic
| rowspan=15 nowrap | Mar 27, 1912 –Jan 3, 1941
| rowspan=3 | Elected in 1912.
| rowspan=2 | Elected in 1912.
| rowspan=5 nowrap | Mar 27, 1912 –Mar 3, 1921
| rowspan=5  | Democratic
| rowspan=5 align=right | Marcus A. Smith
! rowspan=5 | 1

|- style="height:2em"
| 

|- style="height:2em"
| 
| rowspan=3 | 2
| rowspan=3 | Re-elected in 1914.Lost re-election.

|- style="height:2em"
| rowspan=3 | Re-elected in 1916.
| rowspan=3 | 2
| 

|- style="height:2em"
| 

|- style="height:2em"
| 
| rowspan=3 | 3
| rowspan=3 | Elected in 1920.Lost re-election.
| rowspan=3 nowrap | Mar 4, 1921 –Mar 3, 1927
| rowspan=3  | Republican
| rowspan=3 align=right | Ralph H. Cameron
! rowspan=3 | 2

|- style="height:2em"
| rowspan=3 | Re-elected in 1922.
| rowspan=3 | 3
| 

|- style="height:2em"
| 

|- style="height:2em"
| 
| rowspan=3 | 4
| rowspan=3 | First elected in 1926.
| rowspan=21 nowrap | Mar 4, 1927 –Jan 3, 1969
| rowspan=21  | Democratic
| rowspan=21 align=right | Carl Hayden
! rowspan=21 | 3

|- style="height:2em"
| rowspan=3 | Re-elected in 1928.
| rowspan=3 | 4
| 

|- style="height:2em"
| 

|- style="height:2em"
| 
| rowspan=3 | 5
| rowspan=3 | Re-elected in 1932.

|- style="height:2em"
| rowspan=3 | Re-elected in 1934.Lost renomination.
| rowspan=3 | 5
| 

|- style="height:2em"
| 

|- style="height:2em"
| 
| rowspan=3 | 6
| rowspan=3 | Re-elected in 1938.

|- style="height:2em"
! rowspan=6 | 2
| rowspan=6 align=left | Ernest McFarland
| rowspan=6  | Democratic
| rowspan=6 nowrap | Jan 3, 1941 –Jan 3, 1953
| rowspan=3 | Elected in 1940.
| rowspan=3 | 6
| 

|- style="height:2em"
| 

|- style="height:2em"
| 
| rowspan=3 | 7
| rowspan=3 | Re-elected in 1944.

|- style="height:2em"
| rowspan=3 | Re-elected in 1946.Lost re-election.
| rowspan=3 | 7
| 

|- style="height:2em"
| 

|- style="height:2em"
| 
| rowspan=3 | 8
| rowspan=3 | Re-elected in 1950.

|- style="height:2em"
! rowspan=6 | 3
| rowspan=6 align=left | Barry Goldwater
| rowspan=6  | Republican
| rowspan=6 nowrap | Jan 3, 1953 –Jan 3, 1965
| rowspan=3 | First elected in 1952.
| rowspan=3 | 8
| 

|- style="height:2em"
| 

|- style="height:2em"
| 
| rowspan=3 | 9
| rowspan=3 | Re-elected in 1956.

|- style="height:2em"
| rowspan=3 | Re-elected in 1958.Retired to run for U.S. President.
| rowspan=3 | 9
| 

|- style="height:2em"
| 

|- style="height:2em"
| 
| rowspan=3 | 10
| rowspan=3 | Re-elected in 1962.Retired.

|- style="height:2em"
! rowspan=6 | 4
| rowspan=6 align=left | Paul Fannin
| rowspan=6  | Republican
| rowspan=6 nowrap | Jan 3, 1965 –Jan 3, 1977
| rowspan=3 | Elected in 1964.
| rowspan=3 | 10
| 

|- style="height:2em"
| 

|- style="height:2em"
| 
| rowspan=3 | 11
| rowspan=3 | Elected again in 1968.
| rowspan=9 nowrap | Jan 3, 1969 –Jan 3, 1987
| rowspan=9  | Republican
| rowspan=9 align=right | Barry Goldwater
! rowspan=9 | 4

|- style="height:2em"
| rowspan=3 | Re-elected in 1970.Retired.
| rowspan=3 | 11
| 

|- style="height:2em"
| 

|- style="height:2em"
| 
| rowspan=3 | 12
| rowspan=3 | Re-elected in 1974.

|- style="height:2em"
! rowspan=9 | 5
| rowspan=9 align=left | Dennis DeConcini
| rowspan=9  | Democratic
| rowspan=9 nowrap | Jan 3, 1977 –Jan 3, 1995
| rowspan=3 | Elected in 1976.
| rowspan=3 | 12
| 

|- style="height:2em"
| 

|- style="height:2em"
| 
| rowspan=3 | 13
| rowspan=3 | Re-elected in 1980.Retired.

|- style="height:2em"
| rowspan=3 | Re-elected in 1982.
| rowspan=3 | 13
| 

|- style="height:2em"
| 

|- style="height:2em"
| 
| rowspan=3 | 14
| rowspan=3 | Elected in 1986.
| rowspan=16 nowrap | Jan 3, 1987 –Aug 25, 2018
| rowspan=16  | Republican
| rowspan=16 align=right | John McCain
! rowspan=16 | 5

|- style="height:2em"
| rowspan=3 | Re-elected in 1988.Retired.
| rowspan=3 | 14
| 

|- style="height:2em"
| 

|- style="height:2em"
| 
| rowspan=3 | 15
| rowspan=3 | Re-elected in 1992.

|- style="height:2em"
! rowspan=9 | 6
| rowspan=9 align=left | Jon Kyl
| rowspan=9  | Republican
| rowspan=9 nowrap | Jan 3, 1995 –Jan 3, 2013
| rowspan=3 | Elected in 1994.
| rowspan=3 | 15
| 

|- style="height:2em"
| 

|- style="height:2em"
| 
| rowspan=3 | 16
| rowspan=3 | Re-elected in 1998.

|- style="height:2em"
| rowspan=3 | Re-elected in 2000.
| rowspan=3 | 16
| 

|- style="height:2em"
| 

|- style="height:2em"
| 
| rowspan=3 | 17
| rowspan=3 | Re-elected in 2004.

|- style="height:2em"
| rowspan=3 | Re-elected in 2006.Retired.
| rowspan=3 | 17
| 

|- style="height:2em"
| 

|- style="height:2em"
| 
| rowspan=3 | 18
| rowspan=3 | Re-elected in 2010.

|- style="height:2em"
! rowspan=6 | 7
| rowspan=6 align=left | Jeff Flake
| rowspan=6  | Republican
| rowspan=6 nowrap | Jan 3, 2013 –Jan 3, 2019
| rowspan=6 | Elected in 2012.Retired.
| rowspan=6 | 18
| 

|- style="height:2em"
| 

|- style="height:2em"
| rowspan=4 
| rowspan=8 | 19
| Re-elected in 2016.Died.

|- style="height:2em"
| 
| nowrap | Aug 25, 2018 –Sep 4, 2018
| colspan=3 | Vacant

|- style="height:2em"
| Appointed to continue McCain's term.Resigned.
| nowrap | Sep 4, 2018 –Dec 31, 2018
|  | Republican
| align=right | Jon Kyl
! 6

|- style="height:2em"
|  
| nowrap | Dec 31, 2018 –Jan 3, 2019
| colspan=3 | Vacant

|- style="height:2em"
! rowspan=5 | 8
| rowspan=5 align=left | Kyrsten Sinema
| rowspan=3  | Democratic
| rowspan=5 | Jan 3, 2019 –Present
| rowspan=5 | Elected in 2018.Left the Democratic Party on December 9, 2022.
| rowspan=5 | 19
| rowspan=2 
| Appointed to continue McCain's term.Lost election to finish McCain's term.
| nowrap | Jan 3, 2019 –Dec 2, 2020
|  | Republican
| align=right | Martha McSally
! 7

|- style="height:2em"
| rowspan=3 | Elected in 2020 to finish McCain's term.
| rowspan=6 nowrap | Dec 2, 2020 –Present
| rowspan=6  | Democratic
| rowspan=6 align=right | Mark Kelly
! rowspan=6 | 8

|- style="height:2em"
| rowspan=2 

|- style="height:2em"
| rowspan=2  | Independent

|- style="height:2em"
| 
| rowspan=3 | 20
| rowspan=3 | Re-elected in 2022.

|- style="height:2em"
| rowspan=3 colspan=5 | To be determined in the 2024 election.
| rowspan=3 | 20
| 

|- style="height:2em"
| 

|- style="height:2em"
| 
| 21
| colspan=5 | To be determined in the 2028 election.

See also

 List of United States representatives from Arizona
 United States congressional delegations from Arizona
 Elections in Arizona

References 

 
 

 
Senators
Arizona